Walter Aglionby Yelverton (23 January 1772 – 3 June 1834), styled The Honourable from 1795, was an Anglo-Irish politician. 

Yelverton was the son of Barry Yelverton, 1st Viscount Avonmore and Mary Nugent. Between 1797 and 1800 he was the Member of Parliament for Tuam in the Irish House of Commons.

He married Cecilia Yelverton, daughter of George Yelverton, on 28 November 1791; together they had four children.

References

1772 births
1834 deaths
18th-century Anglo-Irish people
19th-century Anglo-Irish people
Irish MPs 1790–1797
Irish MPs 1798–1800
Members of the Parliament of Ireland (pre-1801) for County Galway constituencies
Younger sons of viscounts